A mandir kalash is a metal or stone spire used to top the domes of Hindu temples. It has been used for the purpose since the eras the Chalukyas, Guptas and Mauryas.

Types
Basically, There are four types of mandir kalash:

 Singh-Kalash (Singh: Horn): this is the most commonly used kalash, such as in the Siddhivinayak Temple in Mumbai. It is shaped like the horn of a bull. Hence, it is named so.
 Tri-Kalash (Tri: Three): This is a group of three long kalash. It is mostly used on Gopurams and main gates. Example: Badrinath Temple.
 Matka-Kalash (Matka: Pot): This kalash is shaped like pitchers and earthenware pots. it appears as if pots have been placed on top of one another. Example: Mumba devi Temple.
 Gol-Kalash (Gol: Round): This kalash is round and has a very small and fine tip on top. Example: Jagannath Temple, Puri

Materials
Kalash are mostly made of metal. Main metals used are steel, iron, aluminium and bronze. In famous temples like Shree Samadhi Mandir, Shirdi and Tirupati, noble metals like gold and silver are used. Platinum is rarely used.

In ancient times, temples carved out of stone had stone kalash. Many temples like Ellora Caves, Hampi and Mahabalipuram still have these stone kalash.
In South India, Kalash made of wood are common. Also, in small wooden temples used in homes by Hindu people, kalash are carved of wood or made of metal.

Gallery

References

Hindu temple architecture